The 2016–17 season was the 71st season in HNK Rijeka’s history. It was their 26th successive season in the Croatian First Football League, and 43rd successive top tier season.

Competitions

Overall

Last updated: 31 May 2017.

MAXtv Prva liga

Classification

Results summary

Results by round

Results by opponent

Source: 2016–17 Croatian First Football League article

Matches

MAXtv Prva liga

Source: Croatian Football Federation

Croatian Cup

Source: Croatian Football Federation

UEFA Europa League

Source: uefa.com

Friendlies

Pre-season

On-season (2016)

Mid-season

On-season (2017)

Player seasonal records
Updated 31 May 2017. Competitive matches only.

Goals

Source: Competitive matches

Assists

Source: Competitive matches

Clean sheets

Source: Competitive matches

Disciplinary record

Source: nk-rijeka.hr

Appearances and goals

Source: nk-rijeka.hr

Suspensions

Penalties

Overview of statistics

Transfers

In

Source: Glasilo Hrvatskog nogometnog saveza

Out

Source: Glasilo Hrvatskog nogometnog saveza

Spending:  €500,000
Income:  €15,450,000
Expenditure:  €14,950,000

Notes

References

2016-17
Croatian football clubs 2016–17 season
2016–17 UEFA Europa League participants seasons
2016-17